In The Family is a 2017 Taiwanese drama. It premiered on June 14, 2017, after the finale of Taste of Life, and continued its broadcast every weekday at 8pm on SET Taiwan. The finale of the drama was aired on January 9, 2018 with 150 episodes aired in total.  The final episode was watched by 1.5 million viewers.

Cast

Ye Family (Four Season Beef Noodle Soup)
Pei Xiaolan as Huang Lijuan
Chen Ting as Ye Guolun
Zhang Yuyan as Liu Yunzhen
Han Yu as Ye Xiaochun
Chen Peiqi as Ye Xiaoxia
Athena Lee Yen as Ye Xiaoqiu
Zang Ruixuan as Ye Xiaodong

Lin Family
Yang Lie as Lin Tsung-yuan
Ke Suyun as Cui Yinchai
Chen Yufeng as Lin Weili
Li Liangjin as Yu Le-rong
Wu Cai-ting as Lin Zhiyun
Ding Liqi as Xu Chaoren
Zhao Junya as Lin Weilian
Wang Qing as Lin Fenfen

Xu Family
Jian Chang as Xu Mingzong
Li Fangwen as Song Rui-ci
Chen Zhijiang as Xu Hanmin

Hong Family (Dong-an Create)
Liang Jia-rong as Hong Zhiyong's sister
Norman Chen as Hong Zhiyong
Mai Haiqi as Hong Zuwang

Zhang Family
Lin Andi as Zhang Zhengkai's father
Lin Peijun as Zhang Zhengkai's mother
Huang Wen-hsing as Zhang Zhengkai

Other casts
Liang Zhe as Li Shaofeng
Zheng Yi as Wang Youliang
Zhang Weixi as Wudi
Chen Xiaojing as Ai-wei
Luo Qiao Lun as Liao Sha-sha
Liao Lijun as Li Huizhi
Qian Duoan as Qian Yajun
Pan Weizhi as ???
Zhang Jiaxuan as He Jiali
Ma Youxing as Vegetable Market Vendor
Zhu Ziti as Lin Yawen
Chen Yizhen as ???

Guest casts
Peng Chia-chia as Miao Gong
Tu Kai-hsiang as Jin Jing-li
Bai Yun as Liu Jing-li
Chiu Ping-tian as Ye Xiaochun
Chiu Chen-en as Zhang Zhengkai
Chang Huan-yu as Mr. Jiali

References

External links
In The Family SETTV Website

Chronology

|align="center" colspan="4"|Before:Taste of Life July 28, 2015 - June 16, 2017
|align="center" colspan="4"| SET Taiwan Monday through Thursday 8PM-10:30PM Friday 8PM-10:15PM In The Family June 16, 2017 - January 8, 2018
|align="center" colspan="4"|Next:100% Wife January 9, 2018

|align="center" colspan="4"|Before:Taste of Life August 4, 2015 - June 23, 2017
|align="center" colspan="4"|  SET Drama Monday through Friday 8PM-10:30PM  In The Family June 16, 2017 - January, 2018
|align="center" colspan="4"|Next:100% Wife January, 2018

Sanlih E-Television original programming
Taiwanese drama television series
2017 Taiwanese television series debuts
2018 Taiwanese television series endings
Hokkien-language television shows
Television series set in restaurants